El Ciruelo is a corregimiento in Pesé District, Herrera Province, Panama with a population of 823 as of 2010. Its population as of 1990 was 879; its population as of 2000 was 839.

References

Corregimientos of Herrera Province